Vanquish is a 2021 American action thriller film directed by George Gallo. The film stars Morgan Freeman and Ruby Rose.

Vanquish was released in the United States on April 16, 2021.

Plot

Retired disabled cop Damon (Morgan Freeman) forces Victoria (Ruby Rose), a former drug courier and his caretaker, to collect bags of money around the city during a single night by holding her daughter hostage. As the night progresses, Victoria finds out that at every stop point she makes, various enemies from her past attack her. Meanwhile, a cop breaks into Damon’s home, but Damon kills him.

At her final stop, Victoria is captured and taken to the home of the corrupt Governor. The Governor asks for Victoria’s help in taking down Damon, but Victoria refuses and kills the Governor instead.

Upon finally returning to Damon’s home, Victoria is reunited with her daughter. Then Damon explains that he had no need for the money that Victoria had collected; instead, this night was a part of his plan to eliminate all of Victoria’s enemies along with the corrupt Governor, thus cleaning the city of crime and corruption.

As the dawn breaks, Damon lures all the corrupted cops that had been working for the Governor into his home, where he blows himself up along with them. Meanwhile, Victoria and her daughter escape safely.

Cast
 Ruby Rose as Victoria
 Morgan Freeman as Damon
 Nick Vallelonga as Det. Stevens
 Miles Doleac as Erik
 Patrick Muldoon as Agent Monroe
 Joel Michaely as Rayo
 Juju Journey Brener
 Julie Lott as Governor Ann Driscoll
 Ekaterina Baker
 Hannah Stocking as Galyna

Production
Principal photography occurred in September 2020 in Biloxi, Mississippi.  Filming wrapped in January 2021.

Release
Vanquish was released in select theaters starting from April 16, 2021, as well as on-demand and digital on April 23 and on DVD and Blu-ray April 27.

Critical response 
Review aggregator website Rotten Tomatoes reported that 5% of 64 critics gave the film a positive review, with an average rating of 3.10/10. Metacritic assigned the film a weighted average score of 22 out of 100 based on 14 critics, indicating "generally unfavorable reviews".

Writing for RogerEbert.com, Peter Sobczynski described the film as “a rehash of genre cliches that is so dull, threadbare, and bereft of thrills that the one time that its one moment of genuine excitement comes when our heroine enters a bar where danger is allegedly afoot, and the television in the background is showing curling” and “the kind [of film] that almost makes the DTV drivel that Steven Seagal has been churning out for the last couple of decades seem focused and committed by comparison”, rating it only one out of four stars.

Accolades

References

External links
 

2021 films
2021 action thriller films
American action thriller films
Films shot in Mississippi
Films directed by George Gallo
Lionsgate films
2020s English-language films
2020s American films